Ramunė Aldona Kmieliauskaitė (22 June 1960 in Vilnius – 13 May 2020 in Vilnius) was a Lithuanian graphic artist and watercolor painter. In 1984 she graduated from Vilnius Academy of Art and began appearing in exhibitions. Her work was influenced by ancient Chinese and Japanese art, by impressionist and post-impressionist movements. Her works combine cold and warm colors, free composition, and floral motifs.

See also
List of Lithuanian painters

References
This article was initially translated from Lithuanian Wikipedia

Lithuanian painters
1960 births
2020 deaths
Artists from Vilnius
Vilnius Academy of Arts alumni
20th-century Lithuanian women artists
21st-century Lithuanian women artists